Falfurrias is a city in and the county seat of Brooks County, Texas. Its population was 4,981 at the 2010 census, in a county that in the same census was just over 7,000. The town is named for founder Edward Cunningham Lasater's ranch, La Mota de Falfurrias.

The biggest industry in Falfurrias is the United States Border Patrol interior checkpoint south of the city. As an indirect consequence, many migrants seeking to bypass the checkpoint by setting off across the arid land die of exposure and dehydration.

The biggest issue in Falfurrias in the early 21st century is illegal immigration and the costs this imposes on Brooks County. The costs are for recovering, attempting to identify, and burying the dead migrants.

Falfurrias and Brooks County were featured in a 2014 Latino USA radio story on illegal immigration in South Texas. The 2021 movie Missing in Brooks County deals with the same topic.

Geography

Falfurrias is located in northeastern Brooks County at  (27.226529, –98.144922). The city is centered on the intersection of U.S. Highway 281 (Future Interstate 69C) and State Highway 285.

History
Falfurrias' founding and development were largely due to the efforts of Edward Cunningham Lasater, a pioneer Rio Grande Valley rancher and developer. In 1895, he started a cattle ranch in what was then northern Starr County. At one point, it was one of the largest ranches in Texas. With the extension of the San Antonio and Aransas Pass Railway south from Alice to his ranch in 1904, Lasater founded the town of Falfurrias and subdivided a sizable portion of his ranch land for sale to farmers. In 1898, a post office opened in the community. A local newspaper began publication in 1906. Lasater brought in his Jersey cows and established a creamery in 1909. Sweet-cream butter and other products from Edward Lasater's creamery company made the town a familiar name across the state. That butter, though,  is no longer made from milk produced in Falfurrias. Don Pedro Jaramillo, a Mexican-born curandero known as the "Healer of Los Olmos", was buried in Falfurrias in 1907 and is venerated at a shrine there.

The state granted a petition by local residents to form a new county, Brooks, with Falfurrias as its county seat in 1911. Irrigation methods introduced to the area in the 1920s brought in truck farming and the citrus fruit industry. The city became a primary trade and shipping center for the surrounding region. The area received another economic boost in the 1930s and 1940s when extensive oil and gas reserves were discovered around Falfurrias.

The city had a population of 6,712 in 1950, which declined throughout the latter half of the 20th century; 5,297 people were living in Falfurrias in 2000, and 4,981 in 2010.

The U.S. Customs and Border Protection opened a station in Falfurrias in 1940; the present border checkpoint south of the city opened in 1994. It was renovated and enlarged in 2019, adding new cameras and X-ray machines. According to an NPR report, the station has been increasingly busy due to a surge of migrants coming from Central America. So many migrants die trying to hike around the checkpoint that there have been calls for it to be closed or moved.

Name origin
The name "Falfurrias" antedates Anglo association with the area, and its derivation is uncertain. Town founder Edward C. Lasater claimed that it was a Lipan word meaning "the land of heart's delight". Others believed that it was the Spanish name for a native desert flower known as the heart's delight. Another theory is that Falfurrias is a misspelling of one or another Spanish or French word. Still another theorizes that the name refers to a local shepherd named Don Filfarrias. The term filfarrias is Mexican slang for "dirty and untidy".

Climate
Falfurrias has a hot, semiarid climate (Köppen BSh), bordering on a humid subtropical climate (Cfa) and characterized by very hot, humid, but generally dry summers and warm, dry winters with cold mornings. During the summer, the weather is very unpleasant owing to the heat and humidity, and 12 mornings can be expected to stay at or above , with 22 mornings staying this hot in June 1998 and the hottest morning on record being  on August 19 and 20 of 1915. The hottest temperature on record has been  on July 13, 2016, while 26 afternoons over  can be expected each year, and 146 afternoons can be expected to exceed or reach . September and October bring less extreme, though still hot weather, with the wettest conditions during the year. In the extremely wet September 1967,  fell, including  in four days from the 19th to the 22nd due to Hurricane Beulah.

The winter months are the driest and mildest, although average afternoon temperatures remain above  all year. Seven mornings falling to or below freezing can be expected each winter, although no freezes whatsoever occurred during the winters of 1952–53 and 1994–95, whereas as many as 15 mornings fell to or below freezing in January 1918. Occasionally, a strong easterly flow from the Gulf disturbs the normally dry winter conditions;  fell in January 1958, yet only  was recorded in 5 months from November 1970 to March 1971 – including a 115-day entirely rainless spell from October 6 to January 28.

Demographics

2020 census

As of the 2020 United States census, there were 4,609 people, 1,735 households, and 997 families residing in the city.

2000 census
As of the census of 2000,  5,297 people, 1,801 households, and 1,354 families were residing in the city. The 2,062 housing units averaged . The racial makeup of the city was 75.21% White, 0.25% African American, 0.55% Native American, 0.13% Asian, 0.11% Pacific Islander, 21.56% from other races, and 2.19% from two or more races. Hispanics or Latinos of any race were 92.54% of the population.

Of the 1,801 households, 38.2% had children under the age of 18 living with them, 48.0% were married couples living together, 21.8% had a female householder with no husband present, and 24.8% were not families. About 22.8% of all households were made up of individuals, and 12.4% had someone living alone who was 65 years of age or older. The average household size was 2.90, and the average family size was 3.41.

In the city, the age distribution was 32.2% under  18, 8.9% from 18 to 24, 23.5% from 25 to 44, 20.7% from 45 to 64, and 14.7% 65  or older. The median age was 34 years. For every 100 females, there were 90.5 males. For every 100 females age 18 and over, there were 85.6 males.

The median income for a household in the city was $15,000, and for a family was $18,208. Males had a median income of $23,438 versus $17,973 for females. The per capita income for the city was $9,573. About 43.3% of families and 46.2% of the population were below the poverty line, including 58.0% of those under age 18 and 37.9% of those age 65 or over.

Education

Falfurrias is served by the Brooks County Independent School District.  Schools are:
 Falfurrias Lasater School (pre-K–grade 2)
 Falfurrias Elementary School (grades 3–5) 
 Falfurrias Jr. High School (grades 6–7) 
 Falfurrias High School (grades 9–12)

Notable people
Larry Arnhart, writer and scholar
Mauricio González de la Garza, Mexican writer, journalist and composer

See also
Brooks County Courthouse (Texas)
 Missing in Brooks County

References

External links
 City of Falfurrias official website 

Cities in Brooks County, Texas
Cities in Texas
County seats in Texas
Populated places established in 1924
1924 establishments in Texas